Riaz Khan may refer to:

 Riaz Khan (politician), Pakistani politician
 Riaz Mohammad Khan, Pakistani diplomat
 Riaz Khan (sport shooter)